Iași Sevens is an American football team, based in Iași, Romania.

History
The team was formed in January 2008. The first try-out and practice was held 3 February of that year.

Objectives
The team states that their objectives are the recognition of American football as an official sport in Romania, and the creation and promotion of an internal championship.

Current status
The team trains at the Ciurchi soccer stadium in Children's Park, Iași. The home games are played on Sandu Ville Gorun Rugby Stadium, Iași.

Results
On 28 & 29 March 2009, Iasi Sevens has participated in the 4th edition of the Essonne Flag Event, that took place in Paris, France. The team finished ranked 10th from 12 teams, winning 1 game and tying another.

All the teams play and respect the NCAA football rules.

Roster

See also 
 Romanian American Football Federation
 National American Football Championship of Romania
 Romania national American football team

External links

References

American football teams in Romania
2008 establishments in Romania
American football teams established in 2008